Cleto L. Rodríguez (April 26, 1923 – December 7, 1990) was an American of Mexican descent who served in both the U.S. Army, and in the U.S. Air Force, and received the Medal of Honor for actions in Manila, Philippines during World War II.

Early years
Cleto Rodríguez, a Mexican-American, was born and lived in San Marcos, Texas until his parents died when he was nine years old. After the death of his parents he was sent to live with relatives in San Antonio, Texas. As a boy he worked for the Gunter Hotel as a newsboy. He enlisted in the United States Army in early 1944 where he served as a Private in Company B, 148th Infantry, 37th Infantry Division.

World War II
In Manila on February 9, 1945, Cleto's platoon was ordered to initiate an assault against the Paco Railroad Station that was being held by the Japanese. While crossing an open field in front of the railroad station, his platoon was stopped 100 yards from the station by intense Japanese gunfire. Without being ordered to do so, Cleto and a fellow soldier, Private First Class John N. Reese Jr., left the platoon and continued forward under heavy Japanese gunfire until they made it to a house 60 yards from the railroad station. The two soldiers remained in their position for an hour while firing at targets of opportunity, killing 35 Japanese soldiers and wounding many others. After an hour, the two soldiers moved forward towards the railroad station where they discovered a group of Japanese replacements attempting to reach pillboxes. Cleto and his fellow soldier opened heavy fire, killed more than 40 Japanese soldiers, and stopped any other attempts to reach the pillboxes. The enemy fire increased as the two soldiers came within 20 yards of the railroad station. Reese provided covering fire while Rodriguez moved up to the railroad station, where he threw five grenades through a doorway, killing seven Japanese soldiers, destroying a 20-mm gun, and wrecking a heavy machine gun. With their ammunition running low, the two soldiers made their way back to their platoon while each took turns providing covering fire for the other to move. During the return to their platoon, Private First Class Reese was killed. During the 2½ hours of fighting, the two soldiers killed more than 82 Japanese soldiers and completely disorganized the defense of the railroad station, which paved the way for U.S. soldiers to overwhelm the railroad station in victory. Two days later Cleto again enabled his platoon to advance when he single-handedly killed six Japanese soldiers and destroyed a well placed 20-mm gun. As a result of these actions, both Rodriguez and Reese were presented with the Medal of Honor for their determination to destroy the enemy, and courage in the face of tremendous odds.

Medal of Honor citation

Later years
He later served in the U.S. Air Force from 1952 to 1954 and again served in the U.S. Army from 1955 to 1970. He died on December 7, 1990, in San Antonio, Texas and is buried in Fort Sam Houston National Cemetery.

Namesake
He later married Ms. Flora Muniz and had four children: Cleto Jr., Betty, Mary and Joe; one of his grandchildren is also named Cleto Rodríguez and is a comedian and on-air personality for San Antonio's WOAI-TV and KABB TV stations. In 1975, the elementary school that Rodriguez attended during the 1930s in San Antonio was renamed in his honor, becoming the only school in the San Antonio school district to be named in honor of a former alumnus.

An 8.5-mile segment of U.S. Route 90 in San Antonio, from Interstate 410 to Interstate 35, has been designated the Cleto Rodriguez Freeway in his honor.

A rifle firing range at Ohio National Guard Training Site, Camp Perry, Ohio has been named in honor of Pvt Rodriguez. Camp Perry is the home of the National Rifle and Pistol Championships.

Awards and recognitions
Among Cleto L. Rodríguez's decorations and medals were the following:

See also

List of Medal of Honor recipients
List of Medal of Honor recipients for World War II
List of Hispanic Medal of Honor recipients
Hispanic Americans in World War II

References

Further reading

External links

1923 births
1990 deaths
United States Army Medal of Honor recipients
United States Army personnel of World War II
Recipients of the Silver Star
United States Army soldiers
United States Air Force airmen
American people of Mexican descent
People from San Marcos, Texas
Burials at Fort Sam Houston National Cemetery
World War II recipients of the Medal of Honor
People from San Antonio